Bring Him Home is the fifth studio album by Alfie Boe. It was released on 27 December 2010 in the United Kingdom by Decca Records. The album peaked at number 9 on the UK Albums Chart.

Track listing

Chart performance

Weekly charts

Year-end charts

Certifications

Release history

References

2010 albums
Alfie Boe albums